The following radio stations broadcast on FM frequency 91.8 MHz:

Morocco
Radio Mars at Agadir

Lists of radio stations by frequency